Peter Graves (born Peter Duesler Aurness; March 18, 1926 – March 14, 2010) was an American actor who portrayed Jim Phelps in the CBS television series Mission: Impossible from 1967 to 1973 and in its revival from 1988 to 1990. His elder brother was actor James Arness. Graves also played airline pilot Captain Clarence Oveur in the 1980 comedy film Airplane! and its 1982 sequel Airplane II: The Sequel.

Early life and education
Peter Graves was born Peter Duesler Aurness on March 18, 1926, in Minneapolis, Minnesota, the son of Rolf Cirkler Aurness (1894–1982), a businessman, and his wife Ruth (née Duesler, died 1986), a journalist. Graves's ancestry was Norwegian, German, and English. He used the stage name Graves, a maternal family name, to honor his mother's family, and also so as to not be confused with his elder brother James Arness, star of the television series Gunsmoke.

Graves graduated from Southwest High School in 1944. He served in the United States Army Air Forces during World War II from 1944 to 1945, reaching the rank of corporal, and was awarded the American Campaign Medal and the World War II Victory Medal. After demobilization, Graves enrolled at the University of Minnesota on the G.I. Bill, and was a member of Phi Kappa Psi fraternity.

Career

Graves appeared in more than 70 films, television shows, and television movies during his career. He was featured in a key role in the 1953 World War II film, Stalag 17. In 1955, Graves joined the NBC television series Fury, as the rancher and adoptive single father, Jim Newton.  
 
From 1960 to 1961, Graves starred as Christopher Cobb in 34 episodes of the British/Australian TV series Whiplash. In the storyline, Cobb is an American who arrives in Australia in the 1850s to establish the country's first stagecoach line, using a bullwhip rather than a gun to fight the crooks he encounters. The series also starred Anthony Wickert. Graves also starred in the British ITC series Court Martial, playing U.S. Army lawyer Major Frank Whittaker (one of the series' two American leads starring opposite Bradford Dillman's Captain David Young), as well as guest roles in such series as Alfred Hitchcock Presents, Cimarron City, Route 66, and The Invaders (episode "Moonshot").  In 1967, Graves was recruited by Desilu Studios to replace Steven Hill as the lead actor on Mission: Impossible. Graves portrayed the iconic character of Jim Phelps, the sometimes-gruff director of the Impossible Missions Force, for the six following seasons of the series. After the series ended in 1973, Graves played a cameo-type support role in the feature film Sidecar Racers in Australia which was released in 1975. Graves also made a guest appearance in the teen soap opera Class of 74 in mid-1974, playing himself.

Graves was cast as Palmer Kirby in the 1983 ABC miniseries The Winds of War. He played opposite Robert Mitchum, Jan Michael Vincent, Deborah Winters and Ali MacGraw in what became in 1983, the second-most watched miniseries of all time (after Roots). He reprised the role for the 1988 sequel miniseries, War and Remembrance.  During this time, he became the host of PBS's Discover: The World of Science, based on Discover Magazine.

After playing mainly serious roles in the 1970s, he appeared as Captain Clarence Oveur in the early 1980s comedies Airplane! and Airplane II: The Sequel.

In 1988, a Hollywood writers' strike resulted in a new Mission: Impossible series being commissioned. Graves was the only cast member from the original series to return as a regular, reprising his role as Jim Phelps, though others (most notably Greg Morris, whose son Phil was a regular in this version) made guest appearances. The series was filmed in Australia, and Graves made his third journey there for acting work. The new version of Mission: Impossible lasted for two seasons, ending in 1990. Bookending his work on Mission: Impossible, Graves starred in two pilot films, both called Call to Danger, which were attempts to create a Mission: Impossible–style series.  In the first of these (1968), Graves played a government agent (the Bureau of National Resources) who recruited civilians with special talents for secret missions. In the second Call To Danger, he portrayed an investigator for the Justice Department.

The 1960s version of the pilot, according to Patrick White in The Complete Mission: Impossible Dossier (which White reports was actually the second such pilot, but Graves was not involved in the first), is credited with winning Graves the role of Phelps; after Mission: Impossible ended in 1973, Graves filmed a third version of the pilot (this one structured as a made-for-TV movie), but it did not sell as a series. The concept was later used in the brief 1980s adventure series Masquerade.

During the 1990s, he hosted and narrated the documentary series Biography on A&E. He also acted in a number of films featured on Mystery Science Theater 3000, which subsequently featured running jokes about Graves' Biography work and presumed sibling rivalry with Arness. The films that have been featured on Mystery Science Theater 3000 include SST: Death Flight, It Conquered the World, Beginning of the End, and Parts: The Clonus Horror.  The film Killers from Space was featured in The Film Crew, Michael J. Nelson's follow-up to MST3K. Graves himself parodied his Biography work in the film Men in Black II, hosting an exposé television show. He also played Colonel John Camden in the television series 7th Heaven.

Graves refused to reprise the role of Jim Phelps (played by Jon Voight) in the first 1996 theatrical film of Mission: Impossible, after the character was revealed to be a traitor and the villain of the film. In the film, Phelps murders three fellow IMF agents, and is killed in a helicopter crash at the end, a decision that disappointed Graves and fellow cast members, and upset many fans of the original series.

On October 30, 2009, Graves was honoured with a star on the Hollywood Walk of Fame at 6667 Hollywood Blvd.

AirTran Airways featured Graves in a series of web-only "Internetiquette" videos in 2009 in which Graves appeared in a pilot's uniform and references classic Airplane! lines. The videos were part of an AirTran Airways campaign to promote their in-flight wireless internet access.

In the summer of 2009, Graves signed on as a spokesman for reverse mortgage lender American Advisors Group. Graves' final project was narrating the computer game epic Darkstar: The Interactive Movie, released November 5, 2010.

Personal life

Graves was a devout Methodist of immigrant German Lutheran descent. He was married to Joan Endress Graves for 60 years from 1950 until his death.

On March 6, 1984, Graves was hospitalized at Tahoe Forest Hospital for a fractured jaw among other injuries sustained from a fall on an icy Lake Tahoe road the previous weekend.  He received 100 stitches to his lower lip during his stay.

Graves and his wife Joan had three daughters: Amanda, Kelly, and Claudia.

Graves was a registered Republican.

Death
After returning from brunch on March 14, 2010, Graves collapsed and died of a heart attack, four days before his 84th birthday.

Awards
Graves was awarded a Golden Globe Award in 1971 for his role as Jim Phelps in the series Mission: Impossible.  In 1972, he received the Golden Plate Award of the American Academy of Achievement. He also received nominations for an Emmy Award and Golden Globe awards in other seasons of that show. Graves also won a Primetime Emmy Award for outstanding informational series in 1997 as host of Biography.

Filmography

Film

Partial television credits

Video games

References

External links

 
 
 Peter Graves at Turner Classic Movies
 
 Biography and filmography at Brian's Drive-In Theater
 Peter Graves at The New York Times

1926 births
2010 deaths
20th-century American male actors
21st-century American male actors
American expatriates in Australia
American male film actors
American male television actors
American military personnel of World War II
American people of English descent
American people of German descent
American people of Norwegian descent
Best Drama Actor Golden Globe (television) winners
Male actors from Minneapolis
Male actors from New Jersey
Male Spaghetti Western actors
Military personnel from Minneapolis
Military personnel from Minnesota
People from Sussex County, New Jersey
United States Army Air Forces non-commissioned officers
United States Army Air Forces personnel of World War II
University of Minnesota alumni
Burials at San Fernando Mission Cemetery
California Republicans
New Jersey Republicans
Minnesota Republicans
American Methodists